Lieutenant-General Sir William Boog Leishman,  (6 November 1865 – 2 June 1926) was a Scottish pathologist and British Army medical officer. He was Director-General of Army Medical Services from 1923 to 1926.

Biography

Leishman was born in Glasgow and attended Westminster School and the University of Glasgow and entered the Royal Army Medical Corps. He served in India, where he did research on enteric fever and kala-azar. He returned to the United Kingdom and was stationed at the Victoria Hospital in Netley in 1897. In 1900 he was made Assistant Professor of Pathology in the Army Medical School, and described a method of staining blood for malaria and other parasites—a modification and simplification of the existing Romanowsky method using a compound of methylene blue and eosin, which became known as Leishman's stain.

In 1901, while examining pathologic specimens of a spleen from a patient who had died of kala azar (now called "visceral leishmaniasis"), he observed oval bodies and published his account of them in 1903.  Charles Donovan of the Indian Medical Service independently found such bodies in other kala azar patients, and they are now known as Leishman–Donovan bodies (not to be confused with Donovan bodies, which are found in Granuloma inguinale, which is caused by Klebsiella granulomatis) and recognized as the protozoan that causes kala azar, Leishmania donovani.

Leishman's name was engraved into the history of parasitology by Sir Ronald Ross, who was impressed by Leishman's work and classified the etiologic agent of kala azar into the separate genus Leishmania. The parasitic organisms from this genus were described earlier by Peter Borovsky in 1892.

Leishman also helped elucidate the life cycle of Spirochaeta duttoni, which causes African tick fever, and, with Almroth Wright, helped develop an effective anti-typhoid inoculation.

He was president of the Royal Society of Tropical Medicine and Hygiene in 1911–1912 and Director General of the Army Medical Services from 1923 to 1926.

He is buried on the eastern side of Highgate Cemetery.

Recognition 
Leishman's name features on the Frieze of the London School of Hygiene & Tropical Medicine. Twenty-three names of public health and tropical medicine pioneers were chosen to feature on the School building in Keppel Street when it was constructed in 1926.

A memorial fund was instituted by subscriptions raised in memory of him and the Leishman Memorial Prize is now awarded annually for work in any branch of medicine, surgery, allied sciences or general duties of the RAMC or RADC.

See also
Leishman stain
Leishmaniasis
Romanowsky stain

References

1865 births
1926 deaths
Medical doctors from Glasgow
Scottish parasitologists
Scottish military medical officers
Scottish inventors
Scottish pathologists
Alumni of the University of Glasgow
People educated at Westminster School, London
British Army lieutenant generals
Burials at Highgate Cemetery
Royal Army Medical Corps officers
Fellows of the Royal Society
Knights Commander of the Order of the Bath
Knights Commander of the Order of St Michael and St George
Knights Bachelor
Foreign recipients of the Distinguished Service Medal (United States)
Recipients of the Distinguished Service Medal (US Army)
Military personnel from Glasgow
Presidents of the Royal Society of Tropical Medicine and Hygiene